Salagena quentinlukei is a moth in the family Cossidae. It is found in Tanzania and Kenya, where it has been recorded from the Taita Hills. The habitat consists of montane and upper montane areas.

The length of the forewings is about 10 mm. The forewings are deep olive buff with black reticulations forming oblique lines from the costa and apex towards the lower termen. The hindwings are citrine drab with faded blackish reticulations (a net-like pattern) forming oblique lines from the inner margin towards the tornus.

Etymology
The species is named for Quentin Luke.

References

Natural History Museum Lepidoptera generic names catalog

Metarbelinae
Lepidoptera of Kenya
Lepidoptera of Tanzania
Moths described in 2008